In a kitchen the hob is a projection, shelf, grate or bench for holding food or utensils at the back or side of a hearth (fireplace) to keep them warm, or an internal chimney-corner.  In modern British English usage, the word refers to a cooktop or hotplate, as distinguished from an oven.

Etymology 
The word is a noun meaning approximately "holder", derived from the Old English verb habban "to have, hold".  The word hub "support of a disk or wheel" is apparently from the same source.

Gallery

See also
 Hob (disambiguation)
 Cooktop
 Buttumak

References 

Fireplaces